Ze'ev Katz (born 29 March 1923, died 27 April 1982) was an Israeli politician who served as a member of the Knesset for the Alignment between 1979 and 1981.

Biography
Born in Leipzig in Germany in 1923, Katz joined the Habonim youth movement in 1933. He made aliyah to Mandatory Palestine in 1938, and joined kibbutz Gesher as part of a Youth Aliyah programme.

In 1941 he volunteered to join the British Army. After being demobilised in 1946, he worked as a counsellor to child Holocaust survivors in Italy.

He was on the Alignment list for the 1977 Knesset elections, but failed to win a seat. However, he entered the Knesset on 12 January 1979 as a replacement for Aharon Yadlin, who had resigned his seat. He lost his seat in the 1981 elections.

Katz died in April 1982 at the age of 59.

References

External links

1923 births
1982 deaths
Alignment (Israel) politicians
British Army personnel of World War II
Jewish emigrants from Nazi Germany to Mandatory Palestine
Members of the 9th Knesset (1977–1981)
Politicians from Leipzig